Kosiv Raion is a raion (district) of Ivano-Frankivsk Oblast of Ukraine. The city of Kosiv is the administrative center of the raion. Population: .

Subdivisions

On 18 July 2020, as part of the administrative reform of Ukraine, the number of raions of Ivano-Frankivsk Oblast was reduced to six, however, the area of Kosiv Raion was essentially unchanged. The January 2020 estimate of the raion population was 

Both before and after 2000, the raion consisted of five hromadas:
 Kosiv urban hromada with the administration in the city of Kosiv;
 Kosmach rural hromada with the administration in the selo of Kosmach;
 Kuty settlement hromada with the administration in the urban-type settlement of Kuty;
 Rozhniv rural hromada with the administration in the selo of Rozhniv;
 Yabluniv settlement hromada with the administration in the urban-type settlement of Yabluniv.

General information 
The district is located in the Precarpathian region of Ukraine. The total area is 903 km² with 91,1 thousand inhabitants.

The climate is moderately continental.

The mountains go up to 1000 m above the sea level in the mountainous part of the raion. There are few big rivers among the mountains: Cheremosh — 80 km, Pistynka — 56 km, Rybnytsa — 54 km.

Archaeological finds show that the territory of the raion was inhabited from the Neolithic times.
First written information about Kosiv is from 1424. Firstly, the town was called Rykiv, and only latter it was renamed to Kosiv.
Other old settlements of the raion are Kobaky (15th century), Kuty (1448), Vyzhnii Bereziv (1412).

Famous people 
Famous people that were born, lived or worked in Kosiv district:

 Marko Cheremshyna (1874-1927) was a Ukrainian writer of Hutsul background.
 Dmytro Pavlychko (1929–2023) is a Ukrainian poet, translator, scriptwriter, culturologist, political and public figure, and dissident.

References

Sources 
 Kosiv Raion Rada
 Kosiv Information
 Kosiv Art

Raions of Ivano-Frankivsk Oblast
1939 establishments in Ukraine